Kufoba is a village and municipality in the Qusar Rayon of Azerbaijan.  It has a population of 413.

References 

Populated places in Qusar District